Yodpanomrung Jitmuangnon (ยอดพนมรุ้ง จิตรเมืองนนท์) is a retired Muay Thai fighter.

Titles and accomplishments

Channel 7 Boxing Stadium
 2016 Channel 7 Boxing Stadium 140 lbs Champion
 2014 Channel 7 Stadium Fight of the Year (vs Littewada Sitthikul)
Omnoi Stadium
2015 Omnoi Stadium 135 lbs Champion
World Muay Thai Council
2016 WMC World 140 lbs Champion
Professional Boxing Association of Thailand (PAT) 
2016 Champion of Thailand 135 lbs
International Muay Thai Council 
 2019 IMC Welterweight Champion
IFMA World Muaythai Championships
 2012 IFMA World Championships -63.5 kg

Fight record

|-  style="background:#FFBBBB;"
| 2020-09-18|| Loss ||align=left| Felipe Lobo || ONE Championship: A New Breed 3 || Bangkok, Thailand || Decision (split) || 3 || 3:00
|-  style="background:#cfc;"
| 2020-01-24||Win||align=left| Thananchai Rachanon || Lumpinee Stadium || Bangkok, Thailand ||Decision  || 5 || 3:00
|-
! style=background:white colspan=9 |
|-  style="background:#FFBBBB;"
| 2019-12-19 || Loss ||align=left| Chamuaktong Fightermuaythai || Rajadamnern Stadium || Bangkok, Thailand || Decision  || 5 || 3:00
|-  style="background:#FFBBBB;"
| 2019-10-15||Loss ||align=left| Thananchai Rachanon || Lumpinee Stadium || Bangkok, Thailand ||TKO (Doctor Stoppage/Elbows)|| 4 ||
|-  style="background:#FFBBBB;"
| 2019-09-12||Loss ||align=left| Sangmanee Sor Tienpo || Rajadamnern Stadium || Bangkok, Thailand ||Decision || 5 ||3:00
|-  style="background:#FFBBBB;"
| 2019-07-26 || Loss ||align=left| Rafi Bohic ||  || Hatyai, Thailand || Decision || 5 || 3:00
|-  style="background:#CCFFCC;"
| 2019-05-23 || Win ||align=left| Muangthai PKSaenchaimuaythaigym || Rajadamnern Stadium || Bangkok, Thailand || Decision  || 5 || 3:00
|-  style="background:#cfc;"
| 2019-05-18|| Win ||align=left| Tyler Hardcastle || ONE Championship 94: For Honor || Jakarta, Indonesia || KO || 3 || 2:11
|-  style="background:#CCFFCC;"
| 2019-04-11 || Win ||align=left| Thaksinlek Kiatniwat || Rajadamnern Stadium || Bangkok, Thailand || Decision  || 5 || 3:00
|-  style="background:#CCFFCC;"
| 2019-03-07 || Win ||align=left| Thaksinlek Kiatniwat || Rajadamnern Stadium || Bangkok, Thailand || Decision  || 5 || 3:00
|-  style="background:#CCFFCC;"
| 2019-01-31 || Win ||align=left| Rambo JePowerRupSamui || Rajadamnern Stadium || Bangkok, Thailand || Decision  || 5 || 3:00
|-  style="background:#CCFFCC;"
| 2018-11-15 || Win ||align=left| Phonek Or.Kwanmuang || Rajadamnern Stadium || Bangkok, Thailand || Decision  || 5 || 3:00
|-  style="background:#FFBBBB;"
| 2018-10-10 || Loss ||align=left| Chamuaktong Fightermuaythai || Rajadamnern Stadium || Bangkok, Thailand || Decision  || 5 || 3:00
|-
! style=background:white colspan=9 |
|-  style="background:#FFBBBB;"
| 2018-09-22|| Loss ||align=left| Fabrice Delannon || ONE Championship: Conquest of Heroes || Jakarta, Indonesia || Decision (split) || 3 || 3:00
|-  style="background:#CCFFCC;"
| 2018-08-07|| Win ||align=left| Sangmanee Sor Tienpo ||  || Songkhla, Thailand || Decision || 5 || 3:00
|-  style="background:#FFBBBB;"
| 2018-07-14|| Loss ||align=left| Panpayak Sitchefboontham || Rajadamnern Stadium || Bangkok, Thailand || Decision || 5 || 3:00
|-  style="background:#FFBBBB;"
| 2018-06-14|| Loss ||align=left| Panpayak Sitchefboontham || Rajadamnern Stadium || Bangkok, Thailand || Decision || 5 || 3:00
|-  style="background:#c5d2ea;"
| 2018-05-17|| Draw ||align=left| Yodlekpet Or. Pitisak || Rajadamnern Stadium || Bangkok, Thailand || Decision || 5 || 3:00
|-  style="background:#CCFFCC;"
| 2018-03-17 || Win  ||align=left| Han Zihao || Top King World Series  || Thailand || Decision || 3 || 3:00
|-  style="background:#CCFFCC;"
| 2018-02-10 || Win  ||align=left| Julio Lobo || Top King World Series 17 || China || Decision || 3 || 3:00
|-  style="background:#CCFFCC;"
| 2018-01-17 || Win  ||align=left| Thananchai Rachanon || || Thailand || Decision || 5 || 3:00
|-  style="background:#FFBBBB;"
| 2017-12-29 || Loss ||align=left| Chamuaktong Fightermuaythai || Lumpinee Stadium || Bangkok, Thailand || Decision  || 5 || 3:00
|-  style="background:#FFBBBB;"
| 2017-11-06 || Loss ||align=left| Chamuaktong Fightermuaythai || Rajadamnern Stadium || Bangkok, Thailand || Decision  || 5 || 3:00
|-
! style=background:white colspan=9 |
|-  style="background:#FFBBBB;"
| 2017-09-05|| Loss ||align=left| Phetmorakot Petchyindee Academy || Rajadamnern Stadium || Bangkok, Thailand || Decision || 5 || 3:00
|-  style="background:#CCFFCC;"
| 2017-08-05 || Win ||align=left| Jose Neto ||Topking World Series 15 || Thailand || Extra Round Decision || 4 || 3:00
|-  style="background:#CCFFCC;"
| 2017-07-09 || Win ||align=left| Guo Lizheng ||Topking World Series  || China || Decision || 3 || 3:00
|-  style="background:#CCFFCC;"
| 2017-06-05 || Win ||align=left| Chamuaktong Fightermuaythai || Rajadamnern Stadium || Bangkok, Thailand || Decision  || 5 || 3:00
|-  style="background:#FFBBBB;"
| 2017-05-03 || Loss ||align=left| Thaksinlek Kiatniwat || Rajadamnern Stadium || Bangkok, Thailand || Decision  || 5 || 3:00
|-  style="background:#FFBBBB;"
| 2017-04-06|| Loss ||align=left| Phetmorakot Petchyindee Academy || Rajadamnern Stadium || Bangkok, Thailand || Decision || 5 || 3:00
|-  style="background:#CCFFCC;"
| 2017-03-07 || Win ||align=left| Littewada Sitthikul || Lumpinee Stadium || Bangkok, Thailand || Decision  || 5 || 3:00
|- style="background:#FFBBBB;"
| 2017-02-12 || Loss ||align=left| Chujaroen Dabransarakarm || Channel 7 Boxing Stadium || Bangkok, Thailand || Decision  || 5 || 3:00
|-
! style=background:white colspan=9 |
|-  style="background:#CCFFCC;"
| 2016-12-09 || Win  ||align=left| Muangthai PKSaenchaimuaythaigym || Lumpinee Stadium || Bangkok, Thailand || Decision || 5 || 3:00
|-
! style=background:white colspan=9 |
|-  style="background:#CCFFCC;"
| 2016-11-16 || Win  ||align=left| Rambo Phet Por.Tor.Aor || Lumpinee Stadium || Bangkok, Thailand || Decision || 5 || 3:00
|-  style="background:#FFBBBB;"
| 2016-10-06 || Loss ||align=left| Chamuaktong Fightermuaythai || Rajadamnern Stadium || Bangkok, Thailand || Decision || 5 || 3:00
|-  style="background:#FFBBBB;"
| 2016-09-05|| Loss ||align=left| Phetmorakot Petchyindee Academy || Rajadamnern Stadium || Bangkok, Thailand || Decision || 5 || 3:00
|-  style="background:#CCFFCC;"
| 2016-07-31 || Win ||align=left| Littewada Sitthikul || Channel 7 Boxing Stadium || Bangkok, Thailand || Decision  || 5 || 3:00
|-
! style=background:white colspan=9 |
|-  style="background:#FFBBBB;"
| 2016-06-28 || Loss ||align=left| Rambo Phet Por.Tor.Aor || Lumpinee Stadium || Bangkok, Thailand || Decision || 5 || 3:00
|-  style="background:#CCFFCC;"
| 2016-06-03 || Win ||align=left| Littewada Sitthikul || Lumpinee Stadium || Bangkok, Thailand || Decision  || 5 || 3:00
|-
! style=background:white colspan=9 |
|-  style="background:#CCFFCC;"
| 2016-05-02 || Win ||align=left| Rambo Phet Por.Tor.Aor || Rajadamnern Stadium || Bangkok, Thailand || Decision || 5 || 3:00
|-  style="background:#FFBBBB;"
| 2016-04-07|| Loss ||align=left| Phetmorakot Petchyindee Academy || Rajadamnern Stadium || Bangkok, Thailand || Decision || 5 || 3:00
|-  style="background:#FFBBBB;"
| 2016-03-07 || Loss ||align=left| Littewada Sitthikul ||  || Thailand || Decision  || 5 || 3:00
|-  style="background:#CCFFCC;"
| 2016-01-24 || Win ||align=left| Sittisak Petpayathai || Channel 7 Boxing Stadium || Bangkok, Thailand || Decision  || 5 || 3:00
|-
! style=background:white colspan=9 |
|-  style="background:#CCFFCC;"
| 2015-12-22 || Win ||align=left| Chujaroen Dabransarakarm || Lumpinee Stadium || Bangkok, Thailand || Decision  || 5 || 3:00
|-  style="background:#CCFFCC;"
| 2015-11-09 || Win ||align=left| Chamuaktong Fightermuaythai || Rajadamnern Stadium || Bangkok, Thailand || Decision || 5 || 3:00
|-  style="background:#FFBBBB;"
| 2015-10-05 || Loss ||align=left| Chujaroen Dabransarakarm || Rajadamnern Stadium || Bangkok, Thailand || Decision  || 5 || 3:00
|-  style="background:#FFBBBB;"
| 2015-09-04 || Loss ||align=left| Chujaroen Dabransarakarm || Lumpinee Stadium || Bangkok, Thailand || Decision  || 5 || 3:00
|-  style="background:#c5d2ea;"
| 2015-08-06 || Draw ||align=left| Chamuaktong Fightermuaythai || Rajadamnern Stadium || Bangkok, Thailand || Decision  || 5 || 3:00
|-  style="background:#CCFFCC;"
| 2015-06-30 || Win ||align=left| Kaoyod PK.Saenchaimuaythai || Lumpinee Stadium || Bangkok, Thailand || Decision  || 5 || 3:00
|-  style="background:#CCFFCC;"
| 2015-06-05 || Win ||align=left| Littewada Sitthikul || Lumpinee Stadium || Bangkok, Thailand || TKO || 4 ||
|-  style="background:#CCFFCC;"
| 2015-04-10 || Win ||align=left| Chujaroen Dabransarakarm || Lumpinee Stadium || Bangkok, Thailand || Decision  || 5 || 3:00
|-  style="background:#FFBBBB;"
| 2015-01-15|| Loss ||align=left| Kongsak Saenchaimuaythaigym || Rajadamnern Stadium || Bangkok, Thailand || Decision || 5 || 3:00
|-  style="background:#CCFFCC;"
| 2014-09-21 || Win ||align=left| Littewada Sitthikul || Channel 7 Boxing Stadium || Bangkok, Thailand || Decision || 5 || 3:00
|-  style="background:#FFBBBB;"
| 2014-08-08 || Loss ||align=left| Panpetch Kiayjarernchai || Lumpinee Stadium || Bangkok, Thailand || Decision (unanimous) || 5 || 3:00
|-  style="background:#FFBBBB;"
| 2014-06-06 || Loss ||align=left| Sagetdao Petpayathai || Lumpinee Stadium || Bangkok, Thailand || Decision (unanimous) || 5 || 3:00
|-  style="background:#CCFFCC;"
| 2014-05-02 || Win ||align=left| Sagetdao Petpayathai || Lumpinee Stadium || Bangkok, Thailand || Decision (unanimous) || 5 || 3:00
|-  style="background:#CCFFCC;"
| 2014-04-08 || Win ||align=left| Sittisak Petpayathai || Lumpinee Stadium || Bangkok, Thailand || KO || 5 ||
|-  style="background:#CCFFCC;"
| 2014-02-09 || Win ||align=left| Saksongkram Popteeratam ||  || Thailand || KO ||  ||
|-  style="background:#CCFFCC;"
| 2012-08-22 || Win ||align=left| Saengomorakot Chuwattana || Rajadamnern Stadium || Bangkok, Thailand || Decision|| 5 || 3:00
|-  style="background:#fbb;"
| 2011-12-09 || Loss||align=left| Thongchai Sitsongpeenong ||  || Thailand || Decision || 5 || 3:00
|-  style="background:#CCFFCC;"
| 2011-06-12 || Win ||align=left| Addtevada Wor wiwattananon || Channel 7 Boxing Stadium || Bangkok, Thailand || TKO || 4 ||
|-  style="background:#CCFFCC;"
|  || Win ||align=left| Singpayak Mor. Rajaphat Moo Barn Chombueng || Channel 7 Boxing Stadium || Bangkok, Thailand || Decision || 5 || 3:00
|-
| colspan=9 | Legend:    

|-  style="background:#cfc;"
| 2012-09-13||Win||align=left| Igor Liubchenko || IFMA World Championships 2012, Final || Saint-Petersburg, Russia ||Decision  || 3 || 2:00
|-
! style=background:white colspan=9 |
|-  style="background:#cfc;"
| 2012-09-11||Win||align=left| Dmitry Varats || IFMA World Championships 2012, Semi Final || Saint-Petersburg, Russia ||||  ||
|-  style="background:#cfc;"
| 2012-09-10||Win||align=left|  || IFMA World Championships 2012, Quarter Final || Saint-Petersburg, Russia ||||  ||
|-  style="background:#cfc;"
| 2012-09-||Win||align=left| Zaur Abdulsalamov || IFMA World Championships 2012, 1/8 Final || Saint-Petersburg, Russia ||||  || 
|-
| colspan=9 | Legend:

References

1993 births
Yodpanomrung Jitmuangnon
Living people
ONE Championship kickboxers
Yodpanomrung Jitmuangnon